Kimberley Bowers (born 1993), is an American Trap Shooter. She was born in Berkeley, California USA and shoots for USA Shooting. She represents the USA in Women's Trap Shooting.

Bowers won Bronze at the 2015 Pan American Games in Toronto, Ontario Canada.

References

Living people
1993 births
American female sport shooters
People from Berkeley, California
Pan American Games medalists in shooting
Pan American Games bronze medalists for the United States
Shooters at the 2015 Pan American Games
Medalists at the 2015 Pan American Games
21st-century American women
20th-century American women